Uka Airport was an airfield in Kamchatka Krai, Russia, located 11 km northwest of Uka.  In recent decades, it was probably a civilian airfield, but the configuration and runway length suggests that it may have been a military airfield during the 1950s or 1960s. This airfield was used during the Second World War by US airplanes on their way to Siberia for Lend-Lease program.
Near the airfield is a very big old antenna built for the Russian space programme in 1950s.

Satellite imagery (Google Earth) from 2016-09-22 shows substantial vegetation overgrowth on the runway, suggesting the airport has not been operated in several years prior.

Soviet Air Force bases
Airports built in the Soviet Union
Airports in Kamchatka Krai